The 1965 Cal Poly Pomona Broncos football team represented the Cal Poly Kellogg-Voorhis Unit—now known as California State Polytechnic University, Pomona—as an independent during the 1965 NCAA College Division football season. Led by ninth-year head coach Don Warhurst, Cal Poly Pomona compiled a record of 4–5. The team was outscored by its opponents 196 to 147 263 for the season. The Broncos played home games at Kellogg Field in Pomona, California.

Schedule

References

Cal Poly Pomona
Cal Poly Pomona Broncos football seasons
Cal Poly Pomona Broncos football